Alain Fouché (born 4 December 1942) is a French politician and a member of the Senate of France. He represents the Vienne department and is a member of the Union for a Popular Movement Party.

References
Page on the Senate website 

1942 births
Living people
French Senators of the Fifth Republic
Union for a Popular Movement politicians
Senators of Vienne
Place of birth missing (living people)